West Brook may refer to:
 West Brook, Nova Scotia, a community in Canada
 West Brook (West Branch Delaware River), in New York state
 West Brook High School, in Beaumont, Texas